The Real Thing is a double live album by Taj Mahal, released in 1971. It was recorded on February 13, 1971, at the Fillmore East in New York City and features Taj Mahal backed by a band that includes four tuba players.

Track listing
All tracks by Taj Mahal except where noted.
 "Fishin' Blues" (Henry Thomas) – 2:58
 "Ain't Gwine to Whistle Dixie (Any Mo')" (Chuck Blackwell, Jesse Ed Davis, Gary Gilmore, Taj Mahal) – 9:11
 "Sweet Mama Janisse" – 3:32
 "Going Up to the Country and Paint My Mailbox Blue"	 – 3:24
 "Big Kneed Gal" – 5:34
 "You're Going to Need Somebody on Your Bond" (Blind Willie Johnson) – 6:13
 "Tom and Sally Drake" – 3:39
 "Diving Duck Blues" (Sleepy John Estes) – 3:46
 "John, Ain' It Hard"  – 5:30
 "She Caught the Katy (And Left Me a Mule to Ride)" (Taj Mahal, Yank Rachell) – 4:08
Omitted from the vinyl issue, added to 2000 CD issue. Studio recording appears on The Natch'l Blues (1968).
 "You Ain't No Street Walker Mama, Honey but I Do Love the Way You Strut Your Stuff"  – 18:56

Personnel
 Taj Mahal – vocals, blues harp, chromatic harmonica, National steel-bodied guitar, five-string guitar (banjo), fife
 Howard Johnson – tuba (BB♭, F), flugelhorn, baritone saxophone, brass arrangements
 Bob Stewart – tuba (CC), flugelhorn, trumpet
 Joseph Daley – tuba (BB♭), valve trombone
 Earle McIntyre – tuba (E♭), bass trombone
 Bill Rich – Electric bass
 John Simon – piano, electric piano
 John Hall – Electric guitar
 Greg Thomas – drums
 Kwasi "Rocky" DziDzournu – congas
Technical
Tim Geelan, Glen Kolotkin, Frank Abbey, Jerry Smith – engineer
Anna Hornisher – cover, artwork, design
Irene Harris – cover photography

References

Live at the Fillmore East albums
1971 live albums
Taj Mahal (musician) live albums
Columbia Records live albums
Legacy Recordings live albums
Albums produced by Dave Rubinson
Albums produced by Bob Irwin